Firovo is an urban-type settlement and the administrative center of Firovsky District of Tver Oblast, Russia. It is located on the right bank of the Granichnaya River. Population:

History
Firovo was founded in 1902 as a station on the Bologoye - Polotsk Railway. The station was built at equal distances from Bologoye and Ostashkov. The name was given after the village of Firovka, which existed in the area. The settlement of Firovo was the center of Firovskaya Volost of Valdaysky Uyezd, Novgorod Governorate. Effective October 1, 1927 Novgorod Governorate with its uyezds was abolished, and Rozhdestvensky District was established, with the administrative center in the selo of Rozhdestvo. It was a part of Borovichi Okrug of Leningrad Oblast. Firovo became a part of Rozhdestvensky District. On September 20, 1931, Rozhdestvensky District was abolished and merged into Bologovsky District of Leningrad Oblast.

On March 5, 1935 Kalinin Oblast was established. It included areas which formerly belonged to Moscow, Leningrad, and Western Oblasts. In particular, Firovsky District with the administrative center in Firovo was established. In 1947, Firovo was granted urban-type settlement status. In February 1963, during the abortive administrative reform by Nikita Khrushchev, Firovsky District was merged into Vyshnevolotsky District, but on April 6, 1972 it was re-established. In 1990, Kalinin Oblast was renamed Tver Oblast.

Economy

Industry
There are enterprises of timber and food industries in Firovo.

Transportation
Firovo has a railway station on the railway connecting Bologoye and Velikiye Luki. There is infrequent passenger traffic. A railway connects Firovo with Velikooktyabrsky, but it is only open for cargo traffic.

Firovo is connected by a paved road with Vyshny Volochyok. The road also provides access to the M10 highway which connects Moscow and Saint Petersburg. There are also local roads.

Culture and recreation
Firovo hosts a local museum.

References

Notes

Sources

Urban-type settlements in Tver Oblast
Valdaysky Uyezd